The 1958 Stanford Indians football team represented Stanford University in the 1958 NCAA University Division football season. In head coach Jack Curtice's first season at Stanford, the Indians won only two games, ending the season with a 2–8 record, the school's worst since a winless 1947 season. Home games were played on campus at Stanford Stadium in Stanford, California.

Schedule

Players drafted by the NFL

References

External links
 Game program: Stanford at Washington State – September 20, 1958

Stanford
Stanford Cardinal football seasons
Stanford Indians football